This is a list of composers from Ireland working in the classical (art music) tradition. It does not contain composers for pop, rock, trad, jazz, or film music. For Irish film music composers search for the 'Category:Irish film score composers' in the search box above.

A – D
 Michael Alcorn (born 1962), contemporary composer
 Michael William Balfe (1808–1870), romantic opera composer best known for ''The Bohemian Girl"
 Gerald Barry (born 1952), contemporary composer
 Walter Beckett (1914–1996), 20th-century composer
 Ed Bennett (born 1975), contemporary composer.
 Seóirse Bodley (born 1933), contemporary composer
 Michael Bowles (1909–1998), 20th-century composer
 Brian Boydell (1917–2000), 20th-century composer
 Ina Boyle (1889–1967), female 20th-century composer
 John Buckley (born 1951), contemporary composer
 John Wolf Brennan (born 1954), Switzerland-based contemporary composer
 Thomas O'Brien Butler (1861–1915), Celticist composer
 Charles Thomas Carter (c.1735–1804), 18th-century composer
 Thomas Carter (1769–1800), 18th-century composer
 Patrick Cassidy (composer), contemporary composer
 Charles Clagget (1740–c.1795), 18th-century composer
 Seán Clancy (born 1984), contemporary composer
 Rhona Clarke (born 1958), contemporary composer
 Ann Cleare (born 1983), contemporary composer
 Siobhán Cleary (born 1970), contemporary composer
 Philip Cogan (1750–1833), classical period composer
 Rhoda Coghill (1903–2000), 20th-century composer
 Houston Collisson (1865–1920), opera and ballad composer
 Thomas Simpson Cooke (1782–1848), early 19th-century composer
 Frank Corcoran (born 1944), contemporary composer resident in Germany
 Shaun Davey (born 1948), 20th-century romantic composer
 Jerome de Bromhead (born 1945), contemporary composer
 Raymond Deane (born 1953), contemporary composer
 Donnacha Dennehy (born 1970), contemporary composer and founder of the Crash Ensemble
 Seán Doherty (born 1987), contemporary composer
 Roger Doyle (born 1949), contemporary composer known for electro-acoustic music
 Arthur Duff (1899–1956), 20th-century composer
 Benjamin Dwyer (born 1965), contemporary composer

E – K
 Michele Esposito (1855–1929), Italo-Irish composer
 Hormoz Farhat (born 1929), 20th-century composer
 Eibhlís Farrell (born 1953), 20th-century composer
 Howard Ferguson (1908–1999), Northern Irish composer based in England
 John Field (1782–1837), romantic composer and pianist, notable for cultivating the nocturne
 Aloys Fleischmann (1910–1992), 20th-century composer
 W. H. Grattan Flood (1857–1928), composer and music historian
 David Flynn (born 1977), contemporary composer
 Charlotte Milligan Fox (1864–1916), composer, arranger and folksong collector
 Thomas Augustine Geary (1775–1801), 18th-century composer
 Patrick Gilmore (1829–1892), Irish-American composer and bandmaster
 John William Glover (1815–1899), 19th-century composer
 Deirdre Gribbin (born 1967), contemporary composer
 Wellington Guernsey (1817–1885), ballad and piano composer
 Ronan Guilfoyle (born 1958), contemporary composer and jazz bassist
 Carl Hardebeck (1869–1945), early 20th-century composer and arranger
 Hamilton Harty (1879–1941), late romantic composer and a leading conductor of his time
 Swan Hennessy (1866–1929), Irish-American, Paris-based composer
 Victor Herbert (1859–1924), Irish-American composer of musicals
 Arthur Hervey (1855–1922), late 19th-century composer and music critic
 Michael Holohan (born 1956), contemporary composer and writer
 Ciaran Hope (born 1974), contemporary composer
 Herbert Hughes (1882–1937), composer and skilful arranger of traditional music
 Francis Ireland (1721–1784), late baroque composer
 Fergus Johnston (born 1959), contemporary composer
 T. R. G. Jozé (1853–1924), organist and composer
 William Henry Kearns (1794–1846), 19th-century composer
 Vincent Kennedy (born 1962), contemporary Irish composer
 Michael Kelly (1762–1826), tenor and opera composer
 T.C. Kelly (1917–1985), neo-romantic 20th-century composer
 John Kinsella (1932–2021), contemporary composer

L – O
 John F. Larchet (1884–1967), late romantic composer and influential teacher
 Richard Michael Levey (1811–1899), 19th-century composer, violinist and conductor
 Samuel Lover (1799–1868), composer of operettas and songs
 Michael McGlynn (born 1964), contemporary composer, founder of choral group Anúna
 John McLachlan (born 1964), contemporary composer
 Paul McSwiney (1856–1890), 19th-century composer
 Philip Martin (born 1947), contemporary composer and pianist
 Frederick May (1911–1985), 20th-century composer
 Ernest John Moeran (1894–1950), early 20th-century English composer with Irish connections
 James Lynam Molloy (1837–1909), composer of popular ballads
 Peter K. Moran (1767–1831), early 19th-century composer
 Gráinne Mulvey (born 1966), contemporary composer
 Alicia Adelaide Needham (1863–1945), composer of popular ballads
 Havelock Nelson (1917–1996), 20th-century light music composer
 Ailís Ní Ríain (born 1974), contemporary composer
 Robert O'Dwyer (1862–1949), early 20th-century composer
 Kane O'Hara (c.1711–1782), composer of burlettas (early comic operas)
 Eoin O'Keeffe (born 1979), contemporary composer
 Joseph O'Kelly (1828–1885), Franco-Irish romantic composer
 Arthur O'Leary (1834–1919), 19th-century composer
 Jane O'Leary (born 1946), contemporary American-Irish composer
 Seán Ó Riada (1931–1971), 20th-century composer and arranger of traditional Irish music
 George Alexander Osborne (1806–1893), 19th-century piano composer

P – Z
 Geoffrey Molyneux Palmer (1882–1957), 20th-century composer
 Annie Patterson (1868–1934), early 20th-century composer and musicologist
 A. J. Potter (1918–1980), 20th-century composer
 Joseph Robinson (1815–1898), 19th-century composer, conductor, and teacher
 William Michael Rooke (1794–1847), 19th-century opera composer
 Thomas Roseingrave (c.1690–1766), baroque composer
 Charles Villiers Stanford (1852–1924), prominent late romantic composer
 John Andrew Stevenson (1761–1833), composer of operas and of the original accompaniments to Moore's Melodies
 Robert Prescott Stewart (1825–1894), 19th-century composer, organist and conductor
 Hope Temple (1859–1938), composer of popular ballads
 George William Torrance (1835–1907), 19th-century composer
 Joan Trimble (1915–2000), 20th-century composer
 Gerard Victory (1921–1995), 20th-century composer
 Kevin Volans (born 1949), contemporary composer born in South Africa, now an Irish citizen
 Joseph Augustine Wade (1796–1845), 19th-century composer
 W. Vincent Wallace (1812–1865), 19th-century composer of operas and piano music
 Jennifer Walshe (born 1974), contemporary composer and vocal artist
 Bill Whelan (born 1950), contemporary composer
 Ian Wilson (born 1964), contemporary composer
 James Wilson (1922–2005), prolific Irish-based composer
 Charles Wood (1866–1926), late romantic composer, known for his church music
 Richard Woodward (c.1743–1777), baroque composer

References

Composers
Ireland
Composers